The 2020 United States Senate elections were held on November 3, 2020, with the 33 class 2 seats of the Senate contested in regular elections. Of these, 21 were held by Republicans, and 12 by Democrats. The winners were elected to six-year terms from January 3, 2021, to January 3, 2027. Two special elections for seats held by Republicans were also held in conjunction with the general elections: one in Arizona, to fill the vacancy created by John McCain's death in 2018; and one in Georgia, following Johnny Isakson's resignation in 2019.  These elections ran concurrently with the 2020 United States presidential election in which incumbent President Donald Trump lost to Democratic nominee Joe Biden.

In the 2014 United States Senate elections, the last regularly scheduled elections for Class 2 Senate seats, the Republicans won nine seats from the Democrats and gained a majority, which they continued to hold after the 2016 and 2018 elections. Before the election, Republicans held 53 seats, Democrats held 45 seats, and independents caucusing with the Democrats held two seats, which were not up for re-election. Including the special elections in Arizona and Georgia, Republicans defended 23 seats and the Democrats 12.

In this election, the Democratic Party made a net gain of three Senate seats and the vice presidency, giving them a majority for the first time since 2014, albeit by a narrow 50-50 margin. Democrats unseated four Republicans – in Arizona, in Colorado, and in two elections in Georgia – while Republicans flipped a seat in Alabama. However, Democrats under-performed expectations overall; despite record-breaking turnout and fund-raising efforts, they failed to flip several seats that were considered competitive, and lost many races by much larger margins than expected. Except in Maine, the winning party in every Senate election was the winning party in the state's presidential election.

Due to election laws in Georgia that require candidates to win at least 50% of the vote in the general election, the state's regularly-scheduled and special Senate elections were decided in a run-off election on January 5, 2021. After the November general election, Republicans held 50 seats, while Democrats held 48 and the vice presidency, so sweeping both races was crucial for Democrats to attain a majority. They succeeded in doing so, and the partisan balance in the Senate became tied for the fourth time in history, after the results in the 1880 elections, a brief period in 1953, and the 2000 elections. Vice President Kamala Harris's  tie-breaking vote gave Democrats control of the chamber by the smallest margin possible after the new administration took office. 

This marked the first time since 1980 that either chamber of Congress flipped partisan control in a presidential year, and the first time Democrats did so since 1948.

Election summary

Seats

Votes

Change in composition 
Republicans defended 23 seats, while Democrats defended 12. Each block represents one of the 100 Senate seats. "D#" is a Democratic senator, "I#" is an Independent senator, and "R#" is a Republican senator. They are arranged so that the parties are separated, and a majority is clear by crossing the middle.

Before the elections 
Each block indicates an incumbent senator's actions going into the election. Both Independents caucus with the Democrats.

After the elections 
After the January 5, 2021 runoff elections in Georgia.

Final pre-election predictions 
Several sites and individuals published predictions of competitive seats. These predictions looked at factors such as the strength of the incumbent (if the incumbent was running for re-election) and the other candidates, and the state's partisan lean (reflected in part by the state's Cook Partisan Voting Index rating). The predictions assigned ratings to each seat, indicating the predicted advantage that a party had in winning that seat. Most election predictors used:
 "tossup": no advantage
 "tilt" (used by some predictors): advantage that is not quite as strong as "lean"
 "lean": slight advantage
 "likely": significant, but surmountable, advantage
 "safe" or "solid": near-certain chance of victory

Election dates

Gains, losses and holds

Retirements
One Democrat and three Republicans retired instead of seeking re-election.

Defeats
One Democrat and two Republicans sought re-election but lost in the general election, that included two interim appointees also sought for election to finish the term.

Race summary

Special elections during the preceding Congress 
In each special election, the winner's term begins immediately after their election is certified by their state's government.

Elections are sorted by date then state.

Elections leading to the next Congress 
In each general election, the winner is elected for the term beginning January 3, 2021.

Closest races 
12 races had a margin of victory under 10%:

Alabama 

Incumbent Democrat Doug Jones was elected in a special election in 2017, narrowly defeating Republican nominee Roy Moore. He ran for a full term in 2020, losing to Republican Tommy Tuberville in a landslide.

Tuberville is a former football head coach for Auburn University. He defeated former senator and attorney general Jeff Sessions in a July 14 run-off to secure the Republican nomination, after securing President Donald Trump's endorsement. Sessions occupied the seat until 2017 when he resigned to become attorney general in the Trump administration.

Alabama is one of the country's most Republican states, and Jones's win was in part due to sexual assault allegations against nominee Roy Moore during the special election; most analysts expected the seat to flip back to GOP control. Tuberville defeated Jones by more than 20 percentage points.

Alaska 

One-term Republican Dan Sullivan was elected in 2014, defeating incumbent Democrat Mark Begich. He defeated independent challenger Al Gross to win a second term in office.

Potential Democratic candidates included Begich, who was the Democratic nominee for governor of Alaska in 2018, and Anchorage mayor Ethan Berkowitz, who was the Democratic nominee for governor of Alaska in 2010. One Democrat, Edgar Blatchford, filed to run by the June 1 filing deadline.

Gross, an orthopedic surgeon and fisherman, declared his candidacy on July 2, 2019, as an Independent. He participated in a joint primary for the Alaska Democratic Party, Alaska Libertarian Party and Alaskan Independence Party, winning the nomination as an independent supported by the Democratic Party.

Despite predictions of a close race, Sullivan defeated Gross by 12.7 percentage points.

Arizona (special) 

Six-term Republican John McCain was re-elected in 2016, but died in office on August 25, 2018, after a battle with brain cancer. Republican governor Doug Ducey appointed former senator Jon Kyl to fill the seat temporarily. After Kyl stepped down at the end of the year, Ducey appointed outgoing U.S. Representative Martha McSally to replace him after she lost the election to the other Arizona senate seat. McSally ran in the 2020 special election to fill the remaining two years of the term, losing to Democrat Mark Kelly, a former astronaut.

Once a solidly Republican state, Arizona trended more purple in the late 2010s. Incumbent Republican Martha McSally was appointed to the late John McCain's seat two months after losing the 2018 Arizona U.S. Senate election to Democrat Kyrsten Sinema. Her Democratic opponent, astronaut Mark Kelly, raised significantly more money and generally led her by 5 to 15 points in the polling. McSally also suffered from low approval ratings due to her strong allegiance to Trump, who was unpopular in Arizona despite having won the state by 3.5 points in 2016.

Arkansas 

One-term Republican Tom Cotton was elected in 2014, after serving two years in the United States House of Representatives, defeating incumbent Democratic senator Mark Pryor by a comfortable margin. Cotton was re-elected to a second term by a 33-point margin, defeating Libertarian Ricky Dale Harrington, Jr.

Joshua Mahony, a non-profit executive and 2018 Democratic nominee for Congress in Arkansas's 3rd congressional district, filed to run for the Democratic nomination, but dropped out just after the filing deadline. No other Democrats filed within the filing deadline. Progressive activist Dan Whitfield ran as an independent, but suspended his campaign on October 1, 2020, after failing to qualify for the ballot.

Colorado 

One-term Republican Cory Gardner was elected in 2014 after serving four years in the United States House of Representatives, narrowly defeating one-term Democrat Mark Udall. Gardner sought a second term but lost to Democrat John Hickenlooper by 9.3 percentage points.

Hickenlooper is a popular former governor of Colorado, and led Gardner by as much as 20 percentage points in polls, with most pundits considering him a heavy favorite. Gardner was Colorado's only Republican statewide officeholder, and the once purple state has trended increasingly Democratic since his narrow win in 2014. Gardner also had low approval ratings due to his strong allegiance to Trump, who lost Colorado in 2016 to Hillary Clinton by 4.9%, and in 2020 to Joe Biden by 13.5%. Hickenlooper also raised significantly more money than Gardner.

Delaware 

One-term Democrat Chris Coons was re-elected in 2014; he first took office after winning a 2010 special election, which occurred after long-time senator Joe Biden resigned to become vice president of the United States (Biden also won the 2020 presidential election and became president). He faced an unsuccessful primary challenge from technology executive Jessica Scarane. Conservative activist Lauren Witzke and attorney Jim DeMartino ran for the Republican nomination.

The Delaware primary was held on September 15, 2020.

Georgia 

Due to Republican Senator Johnny Isakson's resignation from office for health reasons in 2019, both of Georgia's Senate seats were up for election in November 2020. The state had tilted Republican in Senate races since the mid-1990s, but increased support for Democrats in populous suburbs has made office elections more competitive; a close governor's race, multiple close U.S. House races, and many other close local office races resulted in Democratic gains in 2018 elections. Both the regular and special election were considered highly competitive toss-ups. Both of these elections received national attention, as if Republicans won at least one of these seats, they would maintain a Senate majority, but if the Democrats won both, the Senate would be split 50/50 with Vice President Kamala Harris breaking the tie.

Georgia (regular) 

One-term Republican David Perdue was elected in 2014, and sought a second term.

Jon Ossoff, a former congressional candidate, documentary film producer, and investigative journalist, defeated former Columbus mayor Teresa Tomlinson and 2018 lieutenant governor nominee Sarah Riggs Amico in the Democratic primary to secure nomination. He faced incumbent Republican David Perdue in the November 3 election.

In the November election, no candidate received 50% or more of the total vote; per Georgia law, the election advanced to a run-off between the top two finishers, Ossoff and Perdue, on January 5, 2021. Ossoff was projected the winner on January 6, and Perdue conceded on January 8.

Georgia (special) 

Three-term Senator Johnny Isakson announced on August 28, 2019, that he would resign from the Senate on December 31, 2019, citing health concerns. Georgia governor Brian Kemp appointed Republican Kelly Loeffler to replace Isakson until a special election could be held; Loeffler took office on January 6, 2020, and competed in the November 2020 election to retain her seat.

Other Republicans who ran for the seat included Wayne Johnson, former chief operating officer of the Office of Federal Student Aid, and four-term U.S. representative Doug Collins.

A "jungle primary" was held November 3, 2020, but no candidate won more than 50% of the vote, so a run-off election between the top two finishers, Loeffler and Democratic challenger Raphael Warnock, was held on January 5, 2021. Warnock defeated Loeffler, who initially refused to concede and vowed to challenge the outcome, but conceded on January 7, after the storming of the U.S. Capitol.

Idaho 

Two-term republican Jim Risch successfully ran for a third term in 2020, defeating Democrat Paulette Jordan in a landslide. Jordan is a former gubernatorial nominee and former Coeur d'Alene Tribal Councilwoman.

Illinois 

Four-term democrat  and Senate minority whip Dick Durbin, easily won a fifth term in office, defeating Republican Mark Curran by a 16-point margin.

Curran served as sheriff of Lake County from 2006 to 2018 and won the Republican primary with 41.55% of the vote.

Antiwar activist Marilyn Jordan Lawlor and state representative Anne Stava-Murray briefly challenged Durbin in the Democratic primary, but both ended up withdrawing.

2019 Chicago mayoral candidate Willie Wilson, a businessman and perennial candidate, ran as a member of the "Willie Wilson Party," with the backing of a handful of Chicago aldermen and the Chicago Police Union.

Iowa 

One-term republican Joni Ernst, first elected to the Senate in 2014, won a second term in office, defeating Democrat Theresa Greenfield.

Greenfield won the Democratic nomination, defeating former vice-admiral Michael T. Franken, attorney Kimberly Graham, and businessman Eddie Mauro in the primary.

Ernst's popularity had dropped in polls, and many considered this seat a possible Democratic pick-up, but Ernst was re-elected by a larger-than-expected 6.5 points.

Kansas 

Four-term  Republican Pat Roberts, was re-elected in 2014 with 53.15% of the vote, and announced on January 4, 2019, that he would not be running for re-election in 2020.

In the Republican primary, United States representative Roger Marshall defeated former Kansas secretary of state Kris Kobach, state Turnpike Authority chairman Dave Lindstrom, state senate president Susan Wagle, and others.

There was considerable speculation about a Senate bid by Mike Pompeo (the United States secretary of state, former director of the Central Intelligence Agency, and former U.S. representative for Kansas's 4th congressional district), but he did not run.

Barbara Bollier, a state senator and former Republican, defeated former congressional candidate Robert Tillman for the Democratic nomination, but lost to Marshall with a more than expected 11.4 point margin.

Kentucky 

Republican Mitch McConnell, the Senate Majority Leader, defeated Democrat Amy McGrath by 19.6 percentage points, winning a 7th term in office.

Louisiana 

Republican Bill Cassidy won a second term in office, defeating Democrat Adrian Perkins and others.

A Louisiana primary (a form of jungle primary) was held on November 3. Had no candidate won a majority of the vote in the primary, a run-off election would have been held, but Cassidy won in the first round.

Maine 

Republican Susan Collins won a fifth term in office, defeating Speaker of the Maine House of Representatives Sara Gideon.

Gideon consistently led Collins in polls for almost the entire election cycle. Collins is considered one of the most moderate Republicans in the Senate and had never faced a competitive re-election campaign, even though Maine leans Democratic. But she faced growing unpopularity due to her increasingly conservative voting record, and her votes to confirm Brett Kavanaugh to the Supreme Court and to acquit Trump in his impeachment trial. Despite almost all polling and Gideon's formidable funding, Collins was re-elected by a surprising 8.6-point margin.

Educator and activist Lisa Savage also ran as a candidate for the Green party.

Massachusetts 

Democrat Ed Markey was re-elected in 2014, having won a 2013 special election to replace long-time incumbent John Kerry, who resigned to become U.S. secretary of state. He easily won a second full term in 2020, defeating Republican Kevin O'Connor by more than 33 percentage points.

Markey fended off a primary challenge from Joe Kennedy III, four-term U.S. representative for Massachusetts's Fourth District and grandson of former U.S. senator and U.S. attorney general Robert F. Kennedy. This marked the first time a member of the Kennedy family lost an election in Massachusetts.

O'Connor defeated Shiva Ayyadurai, a former independent senate candidate, in the Republican primary.

On August 24, 2020, perennial candidate Vermin Supreme launched a write-in campaign for the Libertarian nomination, but received too few votes to qualify for the general election ballot.

Michigan 

Democrat Gary Peters narrowly won a second term in office, defeating Republican John James.

James won a Republican Michigan Senate nomination for his second time, having run against incumbent Democrat Debbie Stabenow in 2018 for Michigan's other senate seat. He faced only token opposition for the 2020 Republican nomination, running against perennial candidate Bob Carr.

Minnesota 

Incumbent Democrat Tina Smith was appointed to the U.S. Senate to replace Al Franken in 2018 after serving as lieutenant governor, and won a special election later in 2018 to serve the remainder of Franken's term. She defeated Republican Jason Lewis, winning her first full term in office.

Mississippi 

Incumbent Republican Cindy Hyde-Smith won her first full term in office, defeating Democrat and former U.S. secretary of agriculture Mike Espy by 10 percentage points. This race was an exact rematch of the 2018 Mississippi Senate special election, in which Hyde-Smith defeated Espy for the remaining two years of the seat's term.

Libertarian candidate Jimmy Edwards also made the general election ballot.

Montana 

Republican Steve Daines won a second term in office, defeating the Democratic nominee, Montana Governor Steve Bullock.

Daines was opposed (before his nomination) in the Republican primary by hardware store manager Daniel Larson and former Democratic speaker of the Montana House of Representatives John Driscoll, who changed parties in 2020.

Bullock won the Democratic nomination, defeating nuclear engineer and U.S. Navy veteran John Mues.

Libertarian and Green party candidates were set to appear on the general election ballot, but the Libertarians refused to nominate a replacement after their nominee withdrew and the Greens' nominee was disqualified.

Once Bullock filed his candidacy, the race became seen as highly competitive. Bullock, a popular governor and a moderate, led in many polls in the spring and summer of 2020, and raised more money than Daines. Closer to election day, Bullock slightly trailed in polls, but the election was still seen as relatively competitive. Daines defeated Bullock by a larger-than-expected 10-point margin.

Nebraska 

Republican Ben Sasse easily won a second term in office, defeating Democrat Chris Janicek by more than 30 percentage points.

Sasse had defeated businessman and former Lancaster County Republican Party chair Matt Innis in the Republican primary with 75.2% of the vote.

Businessman and 2018 U.S. Senate candidate Chris Janicek won the Democratic primary with 30.7% of the vote, defeating six other candidates.

Libertarian candidate Gene Siadek also appeared on the general election ballot.

After the primary election, the Nebraska Democratic party withdrew its support from Janicek when allegations that he sexually harassed a campaign staffer emerged. Janicek refused to leave the race despite the state party endorsing his former primary opponent, which led former Democratic Congressman Brad Ashford to announce a write-in campaign on August 23, 2020. After Janicek vowed to remain in the race anyway, Ashford withdrew on August 27, citing lack of time and resources necessary for a U.S. Senate campaign. The state Democratic Party subsequently threw its support behind long-time Nebraska activist Preston Love, Jr., who declared a write-in candidacy for the seat.

New Hampshire 

Two-term Democrat Jeanne Shaheen won a third term in office by nearly 16 percentage points, defeating Republican Corky Messner.

Messner defeated U.S. Army brigadier general Donald C. Bolduc and perennial candidate Andy Martin for the Republican nomination, winning the nomination on September 8.

Libertarian Justin O'Donnell also appeared on the general election ballot.

New Jersey 

Democrat Cory Booker won a second full term in office, having first won his seat in a 2013 special election after serving seven years as the mayor of Newark. He defeated Republican Rick Mehta by a margin of more than 16 percentage points.

Booker had sought his party's nomination for President of the United States in 2020. He suspended his presidential campaign on January 13, 2020, and confirmed his intention to seek a second Senate term.

Attorney Rik Mehta defeated engineer Hirsh Singh, 2018 Independent U.S. Senate candidate Tricia Flanagan, 2018 independent U.S. Senate candidate Natalie Lynn Rivera, and Eugene Anagnos for the Republican nomination.

Green Party candidate Madelyn Hoffman and two independent candidates also appeared on the general election ballot.

New Jersey has not elected a Republican senator since 1972, and all pundits expected Booker to be easily re-elected.

New Mexico 

Two-term Democrat Tom Udall was the only incumbent Democratic U.S. senator retiring in 2020. Democratic U.S. representative Ben Ray Luján defeated Republican Mark Ronchetti by 6 percentage points.

Luján won the Democratic nomination without serious opposition.

Ronchetti, the former KRQE chief meteorologist, defeated former U.S. Interior Department official Gavin Clarkson and executive director for the New Mexico Alliance for Life Elisa Martinez in the primary.

Libertarian Bob Walsh also appeared on the general election ballot.

North Carolina 

Republican Thom Tillis won a second term in office, defeating Democratic former state senator Cal Cunningham.

Cunningham defeated state senator Erica D. Smith and Mecklenburg County commissioner Trevor Fuller for the Democratic nomination. Tillis defeated three opponents.

The Libertarian Party and the Constitution Party had candidates on the general election ballot.

Despite having grown unpopular among both centrist and conservative Republicans due to his inconsistent support of Trump, and trailing narrowly in polls for almost the entire cycle, Tillis won re-election by nearly 2 points.

Oklahoma 

Republican Jim Inhofe easily won a fifth term in office, defeating Democrat Abby Broyles by more than 30 percentage points.

Inhofe defeated J.J. Stitt, a farmer and gun shop owner, and Neil Mavis, a former Libertarian Party candidate, for the Republican nomination.

Broyles, an attorney, defeated perennial candidate Sheila Bilyeu and 2018 5th congressional district candidate Elysabeth Britt for the Democratic nomination.

Libertarian candidate Robert Murphy and two Independents also appeared on the general election ballot.

Oklahoma is one of the most solidly Republican states and Inhofe won in a landslide.

Oregon 

Democrat Jeff Merkley won a third term in office, defeating Republican Jo Rae Perkins by more than 17 percentage points. Merkley also received the Oregon Independent Party and the Working Families Party nominations.

Perkins, a 2014 U.S. Senate and 2018 U.S. House candidate, defeated three other candidates in the Republican primary with 49.29% of the vote. She is a supporter of QAnon.

Ibrahim Taher was also on the general election ballot, representing the Pacific Green Party and the Oregon Progressive Party. Gary Dye represented the Libertarian Party.

Rhode Island 

Democrat Jack Reed won a fifth term in office, defeating Republican Allen Waters by more than 33 percentage points.

Both Reed and Waters ran unopposed for their respective nominations.

South Carolina 

Three-term Republican Lindsey Graham won a fourth term in office, defeating Democrat Jaime Harrison by over ten percentage points in a highly publicized race.

Graham defeated three opponents in the June 9 Republican primary.

After his primary opponents dropped out, former South Carolina Democratic Party chairman Jaime Harrison was unopposed for the Democratic nomination.

Bill Bledsoe won the Constitution Party nomination. On October 1, 2020, Bledsoe dropped out of the race and endorsed Graham, but remained on the ballot as required by state law.

Despite the significant Republican lean of the state as a whole, polls indicated that the Senate election was competitive, with summer polling ranging from a tie to a modest advantage for Graham. Graham's popularity had declined as a result of his close embrace of Trump, reversing his outspoken criticism of Trump in the 2016 campaign.

Graham's victory was by a much larger margin than expected, as part of a broader pattern of Republicans overperforming polls in 2020.

South Dakota 

Republican Mike Rounds, former governor of South Dakota, won a second term in office, defeating Democrat Dan Ahlers.

Rounds faced a primary challenge from state representative Scyller Borglum.

Ahlers, a South Dakota state representative, ran unopposed in the Democratic primary.

One independent candidate, Clayton Walker, filed but failed to qualify for the ballot.

Tennessee 

Three-term Republican Lamar Alexander was re-elected in 2014. He announced in December 2018 that he would not seek a fourth term.

Assisted by an endorsement from Trump, former ambassador to Japan Bill Hagerty won the Republican nomination and the seat.

Hagerty defeated orthopedic surgeon Manny Sethi and 13 others in the Republican primary.

Environmental activist Marquita Bradshaw of Memphis defeated James Mackler, an Iraq War veteran and Nashville attorney, in the Democratic primary, a major upset.

Nine independent candidates also appeared on the general election ballot.

Hagerty easily defeated Bradshaw.

Texas 

Republican John Cornyn won a fourth term in office, defeating Democrat MJ Hegar by a little less than ten percentage points.

Cornyn defeated four other candidates in the Republican primary, with 76.04% of the vote.

Hegar, an Air Force combat veteran and the 2018 Democratic nominee for Texas's 31st congressional district, defeated runner-up state senator Royce West and 11 other candidates in the Democratic primary. Hegar and West advanced to a primary run-off election on July 14 to decide the nomination, and Hegar prevailed.

The Green and Libertarian Parties also appeared on the general election ballot. Candidates from the Human Rights Party and the People over Politics Party and three independents failed to qualify.

Statewide races in Texas have been growing more competitive in recent years, and polling in August/September showed Cornyn with a lead of 4–10 points over Hegar, with a significant fraction of the electorate still undecided. Cornyn's victory was at the higher end of the polling spectrum.

Virginia 

Democrat Mark Warner won a third term in office, defeating Republican Daniel Gade.

Warner ran unopposed in the Democratic primary.

Gade, a professor and U.S. Army veteran, defeated teacher Alissa Baldwin and U.S. Army veteran and intelligence officer Thomas Speciale in the Republican primary.

West Virginia 

Republican Shelley Moore Capito was re-elected to a second term in a landslide, defeating Democrat Paula Jean Swearengin by 43 points.

Capito was unsuccessfully challenged in the Republican primary by farmer Larry Butcher and Allen Whitt, president of the West Virginia Family Policy Council.

Swearengin, an environmental activist and unsuccessful candidate for Senate in 2018, won the Democratic primary, defeating former mayor of South Charleston Richie Robb and former state senator Richard Ojeda, who previously ran for Congress and, briefly, president in 2020.

Libertarian candidate David Moran also appeared on the general election ballot.

Wyoming 

Four-term Republican Mike Enzi announced in May 2019 that he would retire. Republican nominee Cynthia Lummis defeated Democratic nominee Merav Ben-David by more than 46 percentage points.

Lummis won the Republican nomination in a field of nine candidates.

Ben-David, the chair of the Department of Zoology and Physiology at the University of Wyoming, defeated community activists Yana Ludwig and James Debrine, think-tank executive Nathan Wendt, and perennial candidates Rex Wilde and Kenneth R. Casner for the Democratic nomination.

See also
 2020 United States elections
 2020 United States House of Representatives elections
 List of new members of the 117th United States Congress
 2020 United States presidential election
 2020 United States gubernatorial elections
 2020 United States Shadow Senator election in the District of Columbia

Notes

References

Further reading